Nor Shirakan, Parskahayk or Persarmenia, was the seventh province of the ancient kingdom of Armenia, situated on the western shore of Lake Urmia, bordered on Adiabene and Atropatene, now in northwestern Iran.

Zarehavan was the centre of the province.

Persarmenia had nine cantons:
 Zarevand/Zaravand
 Her
 Arna ( or )
 Zarehavan
 Tamber
 Trabi
 Ayli or Kurichan
 Mari 
 Arisi

See also
List of regions of old Armenia

References

Bibliography

External links
 Map of Parskahayk (Nor Shirakan). 

Provinces of the Kingdom of Armenia (antiquity)
History of West Azerbaijan Province